David B. Zilberman (Russian: Дави́д Бениами́нович Зильберма́н; May 25, 1938, Odessa – July 25, 1977, Boston) was a Russian-American philosopher and sociologist, scholar of Indian philosophy and culture. He was well-versed in the study of languages and knew Russian, Sanskrit, English, Slavic languages, Ancient Greek, French, and German.

Life and work

USSR
David Zilberman was born in Odessa, Ukraine on May 25, 1938, to Benjamin Zilberman, an engineer-economist, and Riva Timaner, a doctor. He graduated high school in 1955. In 1962, Zilberman was awarded an engineering and meteorology degree from The Odessa State College of Meteorology. From 1962 until 1966, Zilberman was employed as a meteorologist at the local airport in Ashgabat, Turkmenistan, in Central Asia.

Zilberman began his Indological studies in 1962.  He met and became friends with the academician Boris Smirnov, a medical doctor, a Sanskritist, and a leading theosopher in Russia. Zilberman studied Sanskrit under Smirnov while pursuing Indological investigations in logic, Indian yoga, and ritual.  In Turkmenistan he also studied a number of languages in addition to Sanskrit, including Greek, Latin, basic Romano-Germanic languages, and some Slavic languages, and he began writing philosophical essays.

In 1966 Zilberman returned to Odessa. He continued with his philosophical investigations on his own and participated in the Colloquium for Philosophy & History at Odessa State University (organized by Professor Avenir Ujemov Director of the Department of Philosophy). In 1968 he completed a two-year program at the State Institute of Patent Service.  During that period, Zilberman worked at the Odessa State College of Meteorology performing research.  And he worked for a time at a Construction & Development firm for the Black Sea Fleet as a Patent Lawyer.

In 1968 Zilberman was introduced to Professor Georgy Schedrovitsky who headed the Moscow School of Methodology. Schedrovitsky recommended Zilberman to one of Russia's leading sociologists, Professor Yuri Levada, for the post-graduate program at the Institute for Concrete Sociological Research (IKSI) in Moscow. Zilberman participated in the organized by Levada Methodological seminar which united supporters of many different scientific areas and was for a long time considered a semi-legal institution. Zilberman was also a participating member of the Moscow School of Methodology. Participants in the Moscow School seminars included: Alexander Zinoviev, Evald Ilyenkov, Georgy Schedrovitsky, Alexander Piatigorsky, Merab Mamardashvili, Vladimir Lefebvre, Boris Grushin, Oleg Genisaretsky and others. The School was believed by some to be the source of the most important developments in philosophy in the post-War period, rivaling anything done in the Western analytical tradition. The Moscow School of Methodology remains virtually unknown in the West.

During these years Zilberman translated numerous Hindu and Buddhist texts, poetic abstracts from "The Mahabharata", and part of the Tattva-Cintamani tetralogy from Sanskrit.  He wrote articles on Indian philosophy, on sociology and anthropology, and on the sociological theory of tradition, a largely overlooked topic in modern social science.

Zilberman worked closely with Alexander Piatigorsky, writing a number of articles for The Great Soviet Encyclopedia. After leaving the USSR they remained close friends and continued their collaborative research and publication efforts until Zilberman's death in July 1977.

Zilberman's dissertation, A Study of Tradition, became a major project and the focus of his efforts during his final years in the Soviet Union.  Completed in 1972, the work was accepted but remained unpublished due to the unexpected and sudden Soviet suppression of sociological and related research (an event described in Zilberman's "Post-Sociological Society"). The IKSI was closed and it essentially disappeared.  Its members were forced to operate behind the Iron Curtain in a context of severely limited public visibility and without proper scientific recognition under conditions of heightened Soviet-style repression.

In 1972, as he completed his research and wrote his thesis, Zilberman discovered a new type of methodological-philosophical thinking "unlike the known types" which became his central preoccupation for the rest of his life. He called the new method "Modal Methodology."

In 1972, due to an offer accepted by Zilberman to publish an article about Kabbalah abroad, he reportedly became a target of KGB surveillance. Leaving Moscow, Zilberman returned again to Odessa. To earn a living he undertook numerous translations for the Moscow Patriarchy, translating much of the Oxford Theological Dictionary from English to Russian, as well as the History of French Royal Court from French.

Zilberman translated into Russian the book by D. Ingalls Navya-Nyāya Logic and wrote an introductory section to the work dealing with some epistemological aspects of Indian formal logic. The book was published in 1974 in Moscow but without his name. A copious Introductory essay by Zilberman was withdrawn and replaced by a brief Editorial Introduction.

United States 

In 1973, David Zilberman and his family emigrated to the United States. In 1973 Zilberman received a position as a Visiting Assistant Professor in the Department of Anthropology at Hunter College in New York. In September 1974, Zilberman accepted a position as Post-doctoral Fellow with the Committee on South Asian Studies at the University of Chicago.

For the last two years of his life Zilberman taught at Brandeis University in Waltham, Massachusetts, first in the Department of Anthropology, and later in the Department of Philosophy and History of Ideas. Zilberman taught a variety of courses in Indian and Western philosophy and related disciplines.
He applied the theory of Modal Methodology analyzing philosophical traditions of classical Indian and modern Western philosophy. David Zilberman planned to continue his fundamental research in India.
Meanwhile, Zilberman started a book dedicated to thorough research and analysis of the Russian Soviet Philosophy (the manuscript titled Moscow School of Methodology was left unfinished). 
David Zilberman died in 25 of July, 1977 in a car-bicycle collision while returning home from his last seminar with his students at Brandeis. 

His wife Elena Michnik-Zilberman lives in Florida, the younger daughter Alexandra Curtis lives in New York, the older daughter Natalya Carney lives in Boston. His sister Rachel Zilberman lives in Chicago.

Legacy

David Zilberman created a distinctive type of methodological-philosophical thinking, which he called "Modal Methodology" or "Modal Metaphysics", and through this practice defined the "Sum of the Metaphysics". Zilberman attempted to develop the Philosophia Universalis from classical Hindu philosophies and applied it as a new synthesis to Western philosophy. Some contemporary Russian philosophers consider themselves to be David Zilberman followers. Zilberman's archive is saved in the Special Collections of the Mugar Memorial Library. Boston University.
In 1987-1988 at Boston Colloquium for the Philosophy of Science, there was held a Symposium In Memory of David Zilberman. —
In 1993-1994 at Boston Colloquium for the Philosophy of Science,
Professor H. Gourko made a presentation of "Zilberman's Modal Methodology: a New Approach to Philosophy-Building".

Works

The Kabbalah Mysticism and the Social Situation in Spain at the Close of the 15th Century (In Russian) - In: Jews in the USSR, London 1973.
The Jewish Minority in the Soviet Ukraine. - in: Minutes of the Seminar in Ukrainian Studies, Harvard university. 1974, o. 6.
Races and Peoples:Modern Ethnic and Racial Problems. Ethnography, Academy of Sciences, Moscow, 1972. p.351, English summary. Reviewed by DAVID B.ZILBERMAN, University of Chicago - in: American Anthropologist [the flagship journal of the American Anthropological Association], 1975, pp. 929–930.
A Critical Review of E. Conze's translation of «The Large Sutra on Perfect Wisdom»--in: The Journal of Asian Studies, November, 1975.
A Critical Review of D. Kalupahana's «Causality: The Central Philosophy of Buddhism»- - in: The Journal of Asian Studies, May, 1976.
Iconic Calculus? – in: General Systems, vol. XXI, 1976, pp. 183–186.
Ethnography in Soviet Russia. - in: Dialectical Anthropology, Vol. 1, No. 2, Feb. 1976, pp. 135–153
Dissent in the Soviet Union. - In: Liberation,  vol.  20, no.6, Fall 1977, pp. 3–8, edited by R.Cohen, Boston University.
Priblizhayuschie rassuzhdeniya mezhdu tremya litsami o modal’noj metodologii i summe metafizik [Approaching Discourses between Three Persons on Modal Methodology and Summa Metaphysicorum] (in Russian) Russia, Torino, 1980, № 4. P. 285 – 316.
A Social Portrait of the soviet Intelligentsia. A review. - In: Theory and Society, 5 (1978), pp. 277–282.
On Cultural Relativism and  'Radical Doubt'. - In: Science, Politics and Social Practice, BSPS, vol. 164, 1995, pp. 359–372 .
The Emergence of Semiotics in India: Some Approaches to Understanding Laksana in Hindu and Buddhist Philosophical Usages. – in: Semiotica vol. 17, n. 3, 1976, pp. 255–265 (article written together with A.Piatigorsky).
Orthodox Ethics and the Matter of Communism. – in: Studies in the Soviet Thought, vol. 17, 1977, pp. 341–419.
CULTURE-HISTORICAL RECONSTRUCTION AND MYTHOLOGY IN THE ANTHROPOLOGY OF PAUL RADIN  - in: Dialectical Anthropology, Volume 6, June 1982, Issue 4, pp 275–290.
Semantic Shifts in Epic Composition: On the «Modal» Poetics of the Mahabharata. — Semiosis, Michigan, 1984.
Orthodox Ethics and the Matter of Communism. (In Russian) - I. Limbakh Pub.; Russia, Saint Petersburg, 2014.
The Post-Sociological Society. – In: Studies in the Soviet Thought, vol. 18, 1978, pp. 261–328.
DET POSTSOSIOLOGISKE SAMFUNN, av professor David B. Zilberman – translation into Norwegian of, in: online Journal Soviet Philosophy, Norway, June 2006.
The Birth of Meaning in Hindu Thought — Dordrecht; Boston: D. Reidel Pub.; Norwell: Kluwer Academic, 1988.
Understanding Cultural Traditions Through Types of Thinking. abstract from PhD Thesis – In: The Birth of Meaning in Hindu Thought, Chapter VIII.
Genesis of Values in Hindu Philosophy (In Russian) transl. from English by Helena Gourko, ed. A. Ogurtsov.], — Moscow: Editorial, 1998. 
Understanding Cultural Tradition (In Russian) — ed. O. Genisaretsky: Institute for Development in name of G.Schedrovitsky; Pub. ROSSPEN (series “Book of the world”), Russia, Moscow, 2015.
Analogy in Indian and Western Philosophical Thought. — Dordrecht: Springer, 2006.
Understanding Cultural Tradition. — ed. Boris Oguibenine. Motilal Banarsidass Publishing House (mlbd.in), India, New Delhi, 2021.

Selected Bibliography
Piatigorsky A. Preface — in: David B. Zilberman “The Birth of Meaning in Hindu Thought” / Robert S. Cohen Piatigorsky(ed.) D.Reidel Publishing Company, 1988, pp. xiii-xv.
Ethel Dunn Reply to Zil'berman. —  Dialectical Anthropology.
 John W. Cole Anthropology Comes Part-Way Home: Community Studies in Europe. —  Annual Review of Anthropology. Vol. 6 (1977), pp. 349–378
 George Dalton Further Remarks on Exploitation: A Reply to Newcomer and to Derman and Levin. —  American Anthropologist. New Series, Vol. 79, No. 1 (Mar., 1977), pp. 125–134
 Wong, Ka-Ying Timothy Western sociological theory and the Chinese cultural tradition: an assessment,  University of Manitoba (Faculty of Graduate Studies (Electronic Theses and Dissertations)), 1988
Pandit G.L. Rediscovering Indian philosophy: Review of “The Birth of Meaning in Hindu Thought”.— Delhi, University of Delhi, 1989.
Callewaert W.M. Book Review: “The Birth of Meaning in Hindu Thought”.— Tijdschrift voor Filosofie, v51 n4 (19891201): p. 736 (1 page). Published By: Peeters Publishers, 1989. .
Piatigorsky A. A Talk on Zilberman's Ideas on Philosophy as an Object of Science — in: Articles / Philosophy , March 22, 1988.
Pandit G.L. “Rediscovering Indian Philosophy: Out of Text and Into Text”. — H.S. Prasad (ed.), Philosophy, Grammar and Indology, Essays in Honor of Professor Gustav Roth, Indian Books Centre, Delhi, University of Delhi, 1992, pp.41-51.

Nirmalangshu Mukherji. Academic Philosophy in India.—  Economic and Political Weekly. Vol. 37, No. 10 (Mar. 9-15, 2002), pp. 931–936. Published By: Economic and Political Weekly
Shaw J. L. Book Review: “The Birth of Meaning in Hindu Thought”.— International Studies in Philosophy vol.23 (1):143-144. Published By: Center for Interdisciplinary Studies in Philosophy, Interpretation, and Culture, at Binghamton University, archived by PhilPapers, 1991. .
Gourko H. Introductory Essay. In Analogy in Indian and Western Philosophical Thought. — Dordrecht: Springer, 2006., pp.1-41.
Hans van Ditmarsch • Rohit Parikh • R. Ramanujam: Logic in India—Editorial Introduction, Journal of Philosophical Logic., Bs. As. Argentina, Universidad de Salamanca Mar del Plata, September 2011.
Dhruv Raina Decolonization and the Entangled Histories of Science and Philosophy in India.—  Polish Sociological Review. No. 178 (2012), pp. 187–201. Published By: Polskie Towarzystwo Socjologiczne (Polish Sociological Association)
Hans van Ditmarsch • Rohit Parikh • R. Ramanujam: Logic in India—Editorial Introduction, Journal of Philosophical Logic., University of Sevilla, Camilo José Cela s/n, 41018 Sevilla, Spain, 2015.
Materialism of the Charvaka and rationalism of the Buddha, Posted by Sreenivasaraos on October 11, 2012, in Charvaka, Indian Philosophy.— 
Gourko H. “From Apocalyptic to Messianic: Philosophia Universalis”  – PAIDEIA Contemporary Philosophy, BU, 2014.
Bilimoria, P. Article “Thinking Negation in Early Hinduism and Classical Indian Philosophy”, Springer, 2017 
Dhruv Raina "Translating the “Exact” and “Positive” Sciences: Early Twentieth Century Reflections on the Past of the Sciences in India" , Jawaharlal Nehru University, New Delhi, 2015.
Bhattacharya P. Article “The Lost Mahabharata of Jaimini”.— Abridged version of K.K.Handique Memorial Lecture delivered by the author at The Asiatic Society , Calcutta, August 2017.
 Joachim Zweynert Interests versus Culture in the Theory of Institutional Change?  —  Theory and Society
 Joachim Zweynert Contextualizing critical junctures: What Post-Soviet Russia Tells us about Ideas and Institutions. —  Theory and Society
Paris J.B. and Vencovská, A. “The Indian Schema as Analogical Reasoning”, Cited by 2 Related articles. Manchester Institute for Mathematical Sciences School of Mathematics, University of Manchester, 2016.
Roy Tzohar “A Yogacara Buddhist Theory of Metaphor", Oxford University Press, Apr 9, 2018, 256 pages.
Piatigorsky A. Preface — in: David B. Zilberman “Understanding Cultural Tradition” ed. - Boris Oguibenine. Motilal Banarsidass Publishing House (mlbd.in), India, New Delhi, 2021. pp. x-xi.
 Genisaretsky O. A few words about David Zilberman and his philosophizing — in: David B. Zilberman “Understanding Cultural Tradition” ed. - Boris Oguibenine. Motilal Banarsidass Publishing House (mlbd.in), India, New Delhi, 2021. pp. xviii-xxiv.
Nemtsev M. Yu. – David B. Zilberman (1938-1977) in: Filosofia: An Encyclopedia of Russian Thought.
 Michnik-Zilberman E. Biographical notes on a remarkable life — in: David B. Zilberman “Understanding Cultural Tradition” ed. - Boris Oguibenine. Motilal Banarsidass Publishing House (mlbd.in), India, New Delhi, 2021. pp. xii-xvii.
 Zilberman R. On the Possibility of Love. The Joy and Bitterness of Life-long Span. The Story of Philosopher David Zilberman. , “Aletheia”, St. Petersburg, Russia, 2015. (in Russian).
 Gourko H. Modal Methodology of David Zilberman. Minsk: Econompress, Belarus, 2007. (in Russian).
 Fedoseev V. A. Resource of Methodology by David B. Zilberman for Philosophy of Education, ISBN 978-5-903931-72-9, St. Petersburg, Russia, 2010 (in Russian).
Saman Pushpakumara "Edmund Husserl’s Transcendence of Early Buddhist Theory of Consciousness"  – The International Journal of Business and Social Research (IJBSR) Vol. 4 No. 3 (2014): March.

References

1938 births
1977 deaths
Writers from Odesa
Odesa Jews
Soviet emigrants to the United States
Soviet philosophers
20th-century American philosophers
American Indologists
Soviet anthropologists
Soviet historians
Russian Indologists
University of Chicago faculty
Brandeis University faculty
New York University faculty
Cycling road incident deaths